Uch Daraq (also Romanized as Ūch Daraq and Ūchdaraq) is a village in Charuymaq-e Markazi Rural District of the Central District of Charuymaq County, East Azerbaijan province, Iran. At the 2006 National Census, its population was 376 in 75 households. The following census in 2011 counted 392 people in 110 households. The latest census in 2016 showed a population of 420 people in 131 households; it was the largest village in its rural district.

References 

Charuymaq County

Populated places in East Azerbaijan Province

Populated places in Charuymaq County